In enzymology, a cysteamine dioxygenase is an enzyme that catalyzes the chemical reaction

2-aminoethanethiol + O2  hypotaurine

Thus, the two substrates of this enzyme are 2-aminoethanethiol and O2, whereas its product is hypotaurine.

This enzyme belongs to the family of oxidoreductases, specifically those acting on single donors with O2 as oxidant and incorporation of two atoms of oxygen into the substrate (oxygenases). The oxygen incorporated need not be derived from O2.  The systematic name of this enzyme class is 2-aminoethanethiol:oxygen oxidoreductase. Other names in common use include persulfurase, cysteamine oxygenase, and cysteamine:oxygen oxidoreductase.  This enzyme participates in taurine and hypotaurine metabolism.  It employs one cofactor, iron.

References

 
 
 
 

EC 1.13.11
Iron enzymes
Enzymes of unknown structure